Cedric Smith may refer to:

 Cedric Smith (statistician) (1917–2002), British statistician and geneticist
 Cedric Smith (actor) (born 1943), Canadian actor and musician
 Cedric C. Smith (1895–1969), All-American football player for the University of Michigan and the Buffalo All-Americans
 Cedric Smith (American football) (born 1968), played in the NFL from 1990 to 1997
 Jim Smith (cricketer, born 1906) also known as Cedric Ivan James Smith (1906–1979), known as Jim, Middlesex cricketer of the 1930s
 Cedric Smith (painter) (born 1971), African American artistic painter
 Cedric Smith (bowls) (born 1925), England lawn bowler